Paphiopedilum callosum is a species of orchid found from Vietnam to northwestern Peninsular Malaysia. It has been investigated and shown promising results in the treatment of cancer.

References

External links 

callosum
Orchids of Cambodia
Orchids of Laos
Orchids of Malaysia
Orchids of Thailand
Orchids of Vietnam
Pharmacognosy